A Desperate Moment is a 1926 American silent drama film directed by Jack Dawn and starring Wanda Hawley, Theodore von Eltz, and Sheldon Lewis.

Plot
As described in a film magazine review, while on a yachting trip with her father, Virginia Dean falls in love with Captain John Reynolds. The schooner is seized by bandit stowaways, who kill several crewmembers, and then set the elder Peter Dean and the remaining crew adrift, but hold Virginia and John hostage. The vessel catches fire and burns to the waterline and is abandoned, the survivors reaching a tropical island. While the gangsters reform, their leader Blackie Slade incites the island's natives to attack the party. Blackie is slain and the others are rescued by a passing steamer. John and Virginia are then united.

Cast

References

Bibliography
 Munden, Kenneth White. The American Film Institute Catalog of Motion Pictures Produced in the United States, Part 1. University of California Press, 1997.

External links

1926 films
1926 drama films
Silent American drama films
American silent feature films
1920s English-language films
American black-and-white films
1920s American films